Gummivena is a fungal genus in the Mesophelliaceae family. The genus is monotypic, containing the single truffle-like species Gummivena potorooi, found in Western Australia. Described as new to science in 2002, Gummivena is intermediate in form between Castoreum and Gummiglobus, and has a gleba with "veins" of gummy tissue and a three-layered peridium. The specific epithet potorooi refers the fact that the fungus is found only in the range of the rare and endangered species Gilbert's potoroo (Potorous gilbertii).

References

External links
 

Hysterangiales
Monotypic Basidiomycota genera
Truffles (fungi)
Taxa named by James Trappe